The Oslo Marathon is an annual marathon that takes place at the end of September or the beginning of October. There are four distances; marathon, half-marathon, 10 and 3 km.

The track goes along the seaside of Oslofjord, with competitors in the marathon running it twice.

History 
The first Oslo Marathon took place in 1981. After some years without any long distance race, the capital of Norway re-launched the Oslo Marathon in 2004.

The number of participants in the 2010 edition was close to 16,000, of which almost 50% were women.

Results

Marathon

Half Marathon

References
Results
Oslo Marathon. Association of Road Racing Statisticians (2013-01-05). Retrieved on 2013-09-23.
Oslo Marathon. Association of Road Racing Statisticians
Oslo Half Marathon. Association of Road Racing Statisticians

External links 
 Official Site 

Recurring sporting events established in 2004
Marathons in Europe
Athletics competitions in Norway
Sport in Oslo
2004 establishments in Norway